Oberea curtilineata is a species of longhorn beetle in the tribe Saperdini in the genus Oberea, discovered by Pic in 1915.

References

C
Beetles described in 1915